Maja Vtič (born 27 January 1988) is a Slovenian ski jumper.

Career 

In 2007, Vtič won bronze at the FIS Nordic Junior World Ski Championships in Tarvisio, Italy. She placed fifth in the 2011 World Championship in Oslo. In January 2011, she won the national ski jumping competition.

Personal life 

Vtič lives in Mirna.

World Cup

Standings

Individual wins

References

External links

1988 births
Living people
Sportspeople from Novo Mesto
Slovenian female ski jumpers
Olympic ski jumpers of Slovenia
Ski jumpers at the 2014 Winter Olympics
Ski jumpers at the 2007 Winter Universiade
21st-century Slovenian women